August Theodore Dorn (March 25, 1849 – April 3, 1923) was an American farmer and politician.

Born in Tempelburg, West Prussia, Dorn emigrated with his parents, to the United States, in 1860 and settled in Oshkosh, Wisconsin. He eventually settled on a farm in the town of Harrison, Calumet County, Wisconsin. He was also involved with the banking and telephone business. Dorn served as chairman of the Harrison Town Board. He also served on the school board and as justice of the peace. In 1913, Dorn served in the Wisconsin State Assembly and was a Democrat. Dorn died in Chilton, Wisconsin.

Notes

External links

1849 births
1923 deaths
German emigrants to the United States
People from Drawsko County
Farmers from Wisconsin
Businesspeople from Wisconsin
Mayors of places in Wisconsin
School board members in Wisconsin
People from Harrison, Calumet County, Wisconsin
Democratic Party members of the Wisconsin State Assembly